Bible Quiz, also known as Bible Bowl or Bible Quizzing, is a quiz-bowl competition based on Bible memorization and study. The competition takes place between teams (often representing individual churches), and participants are quizzed on the content of a pre-determined section of the Bible. They are a popular activity in some Protestant churches and organizations, particularly in the United States. The exact rules of the game differ depending on the sponsoring organization.

Most organizations have seasons which roughly correspond with the U.S. school year (September–early July), holding local competitions on a monthly basis, with playoffs that lead to a national championship tournament. Contestants are usually students in grades six through twelve, although some organizations also offer a separate division for younger children.

The competition is similar to Quick Recall in many American schools, but it uses the Bible as the subject. Competitions which use the name "Bible Bowl" are modelled on television's College Bowl in the 1950s. All groups feature teams competing to be the first to "buzz in" using an electronic lockout device, much like those still used in TV game shows such as Jeopardy! today.

Some groups also feature a "quoting bee" as an additional part of their competition. Similar to a spelling bee, a contestant is given a verse reference (or references) and must quote the verse verbatim within a time limit (8–30 seconds, depending on the level of competition) or be eliminated.

Bible trivia questions are typically made up from the team coordinators' own Bible knowledge, or derived from other sources, such as Bible trivia board games (i.e. Trivial Pursuit for the Bible) or free online Bible trivia sources.

Other organizations, such as Nazarene Bible Quiz, Assemblies of God Teen Bible Quiz, Bible Quiz Fellowship, World Bible Quiz Association, and Piedmont Quizzing Association, derive their questions solely from the Bible text. Contestants come in teams of up to five people and two or three teams compete in a round.  Quizzers buzz in as the question is being read, using either a hand-activated device or by standing (activating an electric switch in their seat). The first quizzer to buzz in must answer the question; in many competitions, if that person interrupts the moderator before the end of the question, the quizzer must complete the question first and then give the answer. In these organizations, quizzers will often memorize entire books or sets of books, depending on the material given for the year. Those who compete at higher levels often will have the entire material memorized, recallable by any given reference or keyword. Many are able to quote from start to finish in one sitting. Some organizations have competitions where they compete as to accuracy in quoting the material.

History
After the Second World War, youth organizations across the United States formed Youth for Christ as an umbrella organization to coordinate their Christian evangelical action. One of Youth for Christ's popular activities in many areas was Bible quizzing, in which teams organized according to local high schools competed against one another in local areas, known as rallies. Competition would be between three teams of four players each who would attempt to answer twenty questions, read aloud one at a time. After a player answered five questions correctly or three incorrectly he or she would have to be replaced by another player, and other substitutions were also permitted. In some regions of the United States, the local quiz team champions would travel to compete against champion teams from other areas, and national competitions also were held at the annual Winona Lake Bible Conference Youth for Christ conventions in Winona Lake, Indiana, where national team champions were determined. Popularity achieved its zenith in the late 1950s and early 1960s. In the 1959 competition, there were 2000 participating teams and 7000 spectators.

One of the unusual features of early Youth for Christ Bible quizzing was the challenge to participants to jump to their feet from a sitting position to win the right to answer each question.  At first, judges would determine the first to jump by viewing above index cards to see whose head first "broke the plane." But, as time passed, local Youth for Christ rallies built or purchased special seat cushions with electrical relay switches that lit signal lights on consoles after pressure was removed due to the quizzer jumping up from the seat. In this way, the right to answer went to the first to leave his/her seat rather than the first to appear to have jumped, thus removing any advantage for taller participants. This was one of the earliest mixed gender competitions for teens which partially depended on some athletic ability.

As the format of Youth for Christ activities changed in the late 1960s, Bible quiz teams began to represent individual churches, and groups of churches from the same denomination began to hold competitions limited to those denominations apart from the Youth for Christ supervision.

Variants

Alliance Bible Quizzing
Alliance Bible Quizzing is sponsored by the Christian and Missionary Alliance. Quizzing is in game format, similar to Nazarene and Free Methodist. One round (with 3 teams) is 20 questions, and 20 points are added for each correct question. Ten points are deducted for a wrong answer (starting with question number 17), the second personal error, or the third team error and each subsequent error. Quizzers sit on benches with pads attached and 'jump' when they have heard sufficient information to complete the question. The jump sends a signal to the box used to indicate which quizzer rose from the pad first. The quizzer then has 30 seconds to give the correct answer. Similar to Assemblies of God quizzing, a quizzer "errors out" when they answer three questions incorrectly, or "quizzes out" when they answer four questions correctly, winning an extra 10 bonus points if they quiz out with no errors. Should a quizzer quiz out, they are no longer permitted to jump but may remain on the bench for bonus questions. However, if a quizzer errors out, they must leave the bench. If a member of one team errors, the next question is a "toss-up" question, answerable only by the other two non-erring teams. If there is an error on a toss-up question, the non-erring team gets a bonus question. A bonus is the next numbered question, but is only answerable by that team. After Question 15, toss-up questions are numbered 16a, 17a, 18a, 19a, and 20a, and bonus questions are numbered 16b, 17b, 18b, 19b, and 20b.

Types of questions include interrogative (regular) questions, multiple answers, situations, chapter and verse references, quoting a Bible verse or finishing a verse.

An international tournament is held for the top 5-10 quizzers from each district of the C&MA in the U.S and Canada.

Assemblies of God Bible Quiz

'Sponsored by the Assemblies of God, Teen Bible Quiz games feature two teams of three quizzers each, plus up to three substitutes. Games have 20 questions, with point values of 10, 20, or 30 points depending on the difficulty. Quizzers who buzz in first (using hand-operated buzzers which trigger an electronic lockout device) and answer correctly within 30 seconds are awarded the point value; an incorrect response results in a deduction of half the point value. A quizzer who interrupts the quizmaster (the question reader) must first complete the essence of the question and then give the answer; a quizzer who fails to do both correctly is not only penalized with a deduction of half the point value, but allows the opposing team a chance to answer the same question. Individual quizzers with five correct answers in a game "quiz out" and receive a 20-point bonus, but must sit out the remainder of the game; this rule was created with the intent to prevent one individual from dominating the match. This also encourages team play by giving more questions to quizzers who are not as knowledgeable of Scripture or as experienced at quizzing. Similarly, a quizzer with three incorrect answers is also disqualified (known variously as an err out, quiz-out backwards or strikeout), but without further point penalty; the purpose of this rule is to discourage quizzers from "buzzing in" and simply guessing, and also to speed up play.

Monthly matches begin in October. District-level are playoffs in March or April, with top teams moving on to one of eight regional playoffs, and the top five teams from regionals advance to the Teen National Finals, held in July. Teams study a specific portion of the New Testament each season; Hebrews, I and II Peter and Jude are the books used for the 2020–21 season. Questions at the National Finals level can be extremely difficult, such as requiring a seven-verse passage to be quoted perfectly within 30 seconds, or the recollection of a list of twenty or more names or places.

The 2019 Teen National Finals was held at North Central University in Minneapolis, Minnesota, and was won by a team from Lee's Summit, Missouri. The 2020 National Finals was scheduled to be held in Palm Springs, California, but was cancelled due to restrictions on large gatherings enforced by the state government because of the COVID-19 pandemic in the United States. The 2021 National Finals are tentatively scheduled for July 4–9 in St. Louis, Missouri.

Middle School Quiz (known until the 2009–2010 season as "novice quizzing") is for sixth- through eighth-grade students. It is played exactly the same as Teen Bible Quiz but covers a smaller amount of Scripture. Playoffs are at the district and regional levels only, with no national finals. Not all Assemblies of God districts offer Middle School Quiz. Sixth through eighth graders may compete in Teen or Middle School quizzing, but not both in the same season. A handful of districts offer an unofficial competition that covers the same material as Middle School Quiz but is open to higher grades. It is colloquially known as "B-League."

Experience League, also known as XP5 League, was added in 2014 as an entry-level competition and is open to students in grades 6–12. It features a reduced amount of Scripture material to study, with four matches per year covering one or two chapters each, and no review of material from previous matches. Designed as an entry-level version of Teen Bible Quiz, games differ from the standard format in that the first 12 questions are offered to one team only, alternating teams, with standard team-against-team quizzing beginning with the 13th question of each game. There is also no post-season playoff system.

Junior Bible Quiz uses a similar format for children in grades one through six, with some differences: 1) a group of 576 questions and answers covering the entire Bible is used as the subject material, and does not change from year to year; 2) four quizzers and up to four substitutes comprise a team; 3) six correct answers are needed for a "quiz out" and a 10-point bonus (this was also the rule in Teen Bible Quiz until the start of the 2005–2006 season).

There is also a Bible Seal program that covers Junior Bible Quiz questions. The highest nationally recognized level is the Bible Excellence, which is achieved by answering 571 out of 576 questions correctly in one sitting. (Some districts have additional higher levels, such as the Impossible Award. This award can be achieved by answering all 576 questions correctly from breakpoint — the point at which any given question can be distinguished from all the others — in one sitting. This test can often three to four hours to complete.)

Though Bible Quiz is sponsored by the Assemblies of God, teams from churches outside that fellowship may compete. In 2006, a church from outside the Assemblies won the Junior National Championship for the first time in the competition's history; previously, a Southern Baptist and a United Methodist church had each finished in second place.

The 2019 JBQ Festival national championship tournament was held at Victory Worship Center in Tucson, Arizona, and was won by "The Chosen Ones" from Braeswood Church of Houston, Texas, the second straight year and the third time in five years that the church took the championship. The 2019 National JBQ Festival was scheduled to be held at Calvary Church in Naperville, Illinois, but like its Teen Bible Quiz counterpart, the tournament was cancelled due to the COVID-19 pandemic.

Bible Quiz Fellowship
Bible Quiz Fellowship is a non-denominational, international organization currently headquartered in St. Louis, Missouri. BQF has member ministries in Missouri, Iowa, Minnesota, Ohio, Washington, Maryland, Colorado, Wisconsin, New Jersey, and New York. Bible Quiz Fellowship has held a national tournament every April since it split from the Youth Evangelism Association in May 2001. BQF uses slightly modified YEA rules. BQF used the NIV version from its start until the 2012–2013 season when it switched to the ESV.

BQF-style Bible Quizzing is a fast-paced team sport, in which 3 teams of 5-7 people compete to answer questions based directly on scripture verses. Bible Quiz Fellowship uses a modified version of the WBQA's 8-year cycle through the New Testament. In 2010, the 8-year cycle was changed to incorporate Mark and Revelation, so that the cycle now includes the entire New Testament.

Each quiz has two six-minute halves, during which the quizmaster asks as many questions as time allows (usually around 40–50). Approximately 15% of questions are quote questions, for which the reference is given, and the verse must be quoted correctly to get points. The rest of the questions are reference-type questions. Each correct answer is worth 20 points, and points are deducted from the team score, but not individual score, for errors. Five correct answers is a "quiz-out," and three errors are an "error-out"; a ten-point bonus is awarded for a "perfect quiz-out", when a quizzer gets five right and none wrong in a quiz. A 20-point bonus is awarded for the 5th, 6th and 7th quizzers answering correctly

Quizzing usually starts on the local level in August or September, and culminates in a national tournament each April. The next national championship will be held in April 2022 in Coralville, IA. Nationals usually draws 40-45 teams each year, representing about 300 teens.

Starting in 2014, the National Champions win the Moisman Traveling Trophy, which commemorates Mike Moisman, the founder of BQF, who passed in early 2013.

Churches of Christ Bible Bowl
The Churches of Christ host various Bible Bowl competitions throughout the U.S., some nationally such as Lads to Leaders or Leadership Training for Christ, and some of them are more regional such as the Great Southeast Bible Bowl in Huntsville, Alabama and the Great Lakes Bible Bowl in Michigan. The largest of these regional competitions is the annual Bible Bowl held in Cookeville, Tennessee with more than 2,000 participants representing more than 100 congregations in multiple states every year. An online, interactive study tool is available featuring questions used in the national Lads to Leaders conventions.

The Church of God General Conference
The Church of God General Conference (one of a number denominations all using the name "Church of God") sponsors a Bible quiz competition that is similar to the Nazarene/WBQA format.

Free Methodist Bible Quiz
Free Methodist Bible Quiz is sponsored by the Free Methodist Church. Quizzers study specific books of the bible each year, and jump from seat pads in team and individual competition. While the majority of teams in the United States come from the Midwest and Pacific Northwest regions, there are teams from other regions, most notably from Kentucky and New York. Free Methodist quizzing also takes place in Kenya, the Philippines and Taiwan. Teams and individuals compete at monthly conference, regional and multi-regional tournaments throughout the quiz season, culminating in a National Bible Quiz finals each year, hosted by a Free Methodist College/University.

Quiz teams and individuals can compete in four divisions, depending on the experience level of competitors—Young Teen Rookie, Young Teen Veteran, Senior Teen Rookie, or Senior Teen Veteran. Teams and individuals that place receive a trophy and, in some divisions and competitions, scholarships. The winner of the Senior Teen Veteran National Bible Quiz Finals Team competition in Free Methodist Quizzing receives the Alpha-Omega trophy, which consists of a base on which the names of all previous winners are engraved.  The back has three small stained glass windows, and there is also a platform for a detachable trophy that looks like a Bible.  The winning team keeps the bible trophy and transports the base to the Quiz Team Finals the next year.

Missionary Church Bible Quiz
Missionary Church Bible Quiz is sponsored by the Missionary Church. It is similar in format to the Nazarene Bible Quizzing ministry.  Teams are largely from Indiana, Michigan, Ohio and Eastern Canada.

National Bible Bowl
National Bible Bowl, sponsored by the North American Christian Convention from 1964 to 2001, is now managed by National Bible Bowl, an independent non-profit organization since 2001. Most teams still come from churches affiliated with the Christian churches and churches of Christ, a branch of the Restoration Movement, but other churches are now allowed as well. The game format is nearly a direct copy of College Bowl.

Games tend to move very quickly and are played with two teams of 3 to 6 players each with no more than 4 from each team participating at a time. The quizmaster reads "toss-up" questions worth 10 points each no matter the difficulty. Toss-ups start with a statement called a "lead-in" which directs players toward the answer, and then the question is read. Toss-ups can be of various types including "keyword," in which a word used once or twice in the official study text is used in the lead-in and points to a specific answer verse, "general," which asks a question pertaining to a specific concept or idea in the text, "category" which requires one to three answers from a specific category (people, places, numbers, etc.) and "word game," in which players have the opportunity to give one to three word answers based upon some "clue" (rhyming words, words which start with the same letter, etc.) Each player has a hand held signal block on the table in front of him/her with a button and a light on it to recognize which player "buzzed in." Players must begin answering within 3 seconds of buzzing in, but are not timed on the length of their answer, as in other Bible Quiz programs. This is one of the main factors in the speed of the game. Players do not need to finish the question being read; they need only give the correct answer. For "keyword" and "general" toss-ups, they are also allowed to quote the verses where the answer is found. If a question is answered incorrectly, the other team has the opportunity to listen to the rest of the question and then answer. Points are never taken away in National Bible Bowl for any reason, nor is a player ever removed from the game for answering too many questions correctly or incorrectly, but substitutions may be made at half-time. Once a toss-up is answered correctly, a bonus question is read to that player's team on which they may confer. Bonus questions consist of 4 to 8 segments and are worth 20, 25, 30, 35, or 40 points.

Unlike many other quiz programs, National Bible Bowl games have a time limit. A regulation game consists of two 10-minute halves with 20 toss-up and 20 bonus questions; a shortened version of 14 minutes with 15 toss-ups and 15 bonuses is used for round robin competition. The time limit tends to create a faster environment and more closely reflects College Bowl in that it is more entertaining for non-participants to watch. Due to the fact that a regulation game contains 20 toss-ups and 20 bonuses (each of which has from 4 to 8 specific questions), a Bible Bowl game can have a total of 170 different questions asked in the 20 minutes allotted to the game, more than any other Bible Quiz game. Again, this difference requires the game to move rapidly, and also contributes to the audience-friendly nature of the contest, since there is almost constant interaction between the quizmaster and the players. Some of the question types also add to the audience friendliness of the game ("Put these words together to get a brand of soap", "Clue-by-Clue until you know who", etc.).

The official study text material covers both the Old and New Testament, but there is no set cycle used to determine the books of the Bible studied and new questions are created every year, even if the same material is covered again. Because the National Bible Bowl Office provides competition questions for 8 local tournaments (one per month beginning in October), several summer tournaments held at Bible colleges, and the National Tournament), they are responsible for coordinating the writing and editing of competition questions annually.

The competition schedule coincides with the school year and local round robins take place each month in state competitions. Some states hold more than one round robin due to an abundance of teams in the area. In the summer, many teams will meet at some of the several invitational tournaments taking place at Christian Colleges and Universities around the country. In addition to a round robin and main double elimination format tournament, each summer competition also administers a written test, ranging from 150 to 400 questions. Certain competitions, including the National Tournament, also hold "Quoting Bees" wherein a participant is given a verse location and must quote the entire verse from beginning to end verbatim. There are no official district or regional competitions that determine advancement. Assistant Quizmasters are only used in later rounds of double elimination tournaments; otherwise, there is only one Quizmaster per game. The season ends with a national championship tournament open to all teams;(less than a hundred attend)which concludes with a double-elimination bracket-style playoff; where the final games are staged, in front of audiences.

A children's program, called Beginner Bible Bowl, is for children in third through fifth grades. This program has different rules to engage younger players, one of the main differences being official pre-written questions that the children must quote the answers to. There are usually 850-1000 pre-published questions each season, roughly half of which come from a specific portion of the Bible (usually the same as the teen Bible Bowl study text), and the other half from general Bible knowledge.  Unlike other Bible Quiz programs for this age group, most or all of the questions change each season.

Nazarene Bible Quizzing
Nazarene Bible Quizzing is sponsored by the Church of the Nazarene. It is similar to Assemblies of God quizzing, with a few exceptions. Matches are 20 questions in length, and questions are worth 20 points each. Penalty points of ten points each are deducted only when a quizzer "errors out" by answering three questions incorrectly, when a quizzer commits two fouls in a single round, each team error starting with the fifth error, or any error after question number 15; however, only a total of ten points may be deducted on a single question. There are also possible bonus of ten points which occur when a single quizzer "quizzes out without error"—he gets four questions correct without getting a single one wrong—or when a third, fourth, or fifth quizzer on one team gets a correct answer. The latter is meant to encourage participation from all members of the team rather than just one or two quizzers. Another important difference is that teams consist of up to four quizzers with one substitute, rather than three and three. The most obvious difference is the method of buzzing-in — a seated quizzer jumps up, which activates a pad on an electronic lock-out device. When a quizzer jumps and gives an incorrect answer or incorrectly or incompletely finishes the question, he receives an error. The opposite team then receives a chance to get the "bonus"; the quizzer in the seat directly opposite of the quizzer who received an error will be given the complete question and, if he answers correctly, will receive the ten-point bonus for his team. Each team also has a designated captain, as well as a co-captain who assumes the captain's responsibility in the case of an error-out or quiz-out, who has the ability to challenge a ruling (asking for an opposite ruling) or appeal the question's validity (asking for it to be thrown out). A penalty of ten points will be deducted if a captain challenges twice in one quiz and is overruled both times. There is a material cycle consisting of eight books or groups of books: Luke, 1-2 Corinthians, John, Hebrews & 1-2 Peter, Matthew, Romans & James, Acts, Galatians-Ephesians-Philippians-Colossians & Philemon.

Regional competition consists of all-star teams from each district on the region and is held in the spring.  Some regions also include all-star local church teams and an open division which might even include a non-Nazarene team (that team must compete during the year on the district with approval).  During the regional competitions, the first-place church teams and district "all-star" teams compete to form a Regional "all-star" team which will represent their region at nationals. There are two different national competitions in Nazarene Bible quizzing, one which includes local church, district and regional competitions, and one which only involves the regional teams.  These national competitions alternate from one year to the next and are held at one of the regional colleges during even numbered years and during global and USA/Canada events during the odd numbered years. Nazarene Bible Quizzing has a long history in the Church of the Nazarene (50 years), and has been popular with many churches for generations. Quizzers are in their junior and senior high (teenage) years.

Pathfinder Bible Achievement, Seventh-day Adventist 
Pathfinder Bible Achievement has the members of the Bible Bowl team study one book or part of the Bible out of the New King James version. Pathfinders and the Bible Quiz event are run and organized by the Seventh-day Adventist Church. There are 90 questions in the event. The book or part of the Bible changes every year. There are four different stages in Bible Achievement. First, there is the District level; then the Conference level. Finally there is the Division level, in Berrien Springs, Michigan. If a team received a first place in a level, they are then allowed to go on to the next level, and so on and so forth. Finding a team's placement is determined by taking the team's score and comparing it with the top score. If the team's score is within 10% of the top score, the team received a first place. If it is within 20%, the team received a second place. Anything under 20% of the top score is a third place. Bible Achievement is for Pathfinders in 5th through 10th grades.

United Pentecostal Church Bible Quizzing 
Bible quizzing sponsored by the United Pentecostal Church International spans throughout North America and allows other countries to participate. It is similar in game format to Assemblies of God Bible quizzing. The quiz year runs from around January to June for state competitions and through the end of July and beginning of August for national competitions. Many teams start studying as early as November. Young people are given a list of verses from around 170 verses (for 4-8 year olds), around 280 verses (for 9- to 12-year-olds) and 520 verses (for 13- to 18-year-olds) to memorize verbatim. As the quiz year progresses, each tournament accumulates more material being quizzed over. Monthly state tournaments are held during the quiz year. At these tournaments, teams typically compete against each other in double elimination tournaments. During a quiz, two teams face against each other with 3 quizzers on each team sitting at two long tables facing the quizmaster and holding a hand-held buzzer. A team can consist of as few as 2 and as many as 5 quizzers along with either 1 or 2 coaches. The quizmaster reads a question and the first quizzer to buzz in receives the ability to answer that question. Quizzers can interrupt the quizmaster, but must finish what the question would have been (if interrupted) then give the answer within 30 seconds. The quiz consists of 20 questions: 8 ten point questions, 9 twenty point questions and 3 thirty point question for the intermediate teams aging from grade 7-grade 9. The juniors have only 15 questions. The national tournament each year is called the North American Bible Quizzing Tournament (NABQT) and alternates location from year to year.

Wesleyan Bible Bowl
Wesleyan Bible Bowl, sponsored by the Wesleyan Church, is also similar to College Bowl, but games begin with a written quiz.

World Bible Quiz Association
The World Bible Quiz Association is an independent ministry that sponsors quizzing across denominational lines. Its game format is most similar to Nazarene, Free Methodist and Alliance quizzing, and most competing teams come from those three groups. The WBQA has an eight-year cycle of the material studied for each season, which is followed by the Missionary Church quiz program and Wesleyan Bible Bowl, and previously Assemblies of God Teen Bible Quiz. The cycle rotates as follows: Luke (2016–17), followed by 1 & 2 Corinthians, John, Hebrews & 1-2 Peter, Matthew, Romans & James, Acts, and Galatians/Ephesians/Philippians/Colossians/Philemon. The WBQA uses the Berean Study Bible as its translation for quizzing.

WBQA quizzing style is similar to Nazarene. It consists of three teams in a quiz, four players per team (though a team can have up to five, subbing quizzer in and out). A quiz is 20 questions long, and each question is worth 20 points, with a few exceptions. If a team gets a question wrong, that team will sit out the next question, which will be for the other two teams only. If one of those two teams gets the question wrong, the following question is a "free question" to the remaining team, worth 10 points. A quizzer is removed from the quiz if he or she answers four questions correctly or three questions incorrectly. If a quizzer answers four questions correctly without making an error, an extra 10 points are added onto his or her final correct answer and he or she is awarded with a "quiz-out without error." If three separate members of the same team answer a question correctly, that team is awarded a 10-point bonus. If a fourth member of the team answers correctly, another bonus is awarded.

In WBQA quizzing, questions must only contain words from the verse from which the question is taken, plus an interrogative (who/what/where/when/why/how) and, if necessary, a form of the verb "to be" (i.e. was/is/were/am, though in practice very few questions require this addition)--no other helping verbs may be used. All questions must be grammatically correct (with the exception of questions beginning with "what if"). This is the same style of question used in other groups such as Bible Quiz Fellowship.

WBQA operates in close cooperation with numerous independent local leagues in the Great Lakes region, such as Detroit Bible Quizzing, Huron Valley Bible Quizzing in the Ann Arbor area, the Ohio Bible Quizzing Association centered around Chillicothe, the Shenango Valley Bible Quiz league around the Pittsburgh area, BIC (Brethren in Christ) Quizzing in the Harrisburg region, and Rochester Youth for Christ Quizzing around Rochester, Minnesota.

WBQA quizzing held a “World finals” tournament in  summer from 1974 to 2010, usually at a midwestern Christian college or university. Champions nearly always came from the northeast United States, primarily the Pittsburgh area, northeast Ohio, central Pennsylvania, and Maine. The Detroit program enjoyed a period of dominance in the tournament's latter years and remains one of the largest and most competitive WBQA-affiliated organizations today. The “World finals” tournament is now held annually in the Chicago area each year in early April, and registration is open to any team. Other major tournaments include the Great Lakes Regional Tournament in November, and the All-Timers tournament, open to both children and adults, in January.

National Bible Bee

The National Bible Bee is an independent organization to promote biblical literacy. Contestants study questions about the Bible as well as memorize specific passages from the Bible from any of five approved English versions.

Piedmont Quizzing Association
The Piedmont Quizzing Association is based in Greenville, South Carolina and includes about 20 church teams of two to seven quizzers each from the Southeast. Teens in grades 6 through 12 participate. The main quiz season is from August to January, and a tournament is held in February. During the main season, a quiz meet is held once a month. At each quiz meet, each team participates in two twenty-question, two-team quizzes. All questions read by the quizmaster come from the King James Bible, and each question is worth 20 points. A player jumps of the pad on his chair to answer a question, which causes his light to come on in order to alert the quiz master that he jumped first. The quizzer who jumps first gets to answer the question. When the quizzer answers the question correctly, 20 points are awarded his team. When he answers incorrectly, the question is given as a rebound to the other team. After the team's 5th error or Question 15 (whichever comes first), 10 points are also taken off for incorrect answers. A quizzer may "quiz out forwards" if he answers five questions in the quiz correctly, or "quiz out backwards" if he answers four questions incorrectly. In either case, the quizzer leaves his chair, and a substitute may take his place. Quizzers earn 10 points for their team if they "quiz out (forwards) without error." The team that earns the most points in each quiz wins the quiz.

Choice of Bible version 
Historically, most Bible Bowl/Quiz organizations have used either the New International Version or the King James Version as the translation for their programs. More recently some groups such as Bible Quiz Fellowship and World Bible Quiz Association have instead chosen the English Standard Version, and the Assemblies of God has announced plans to transition from the NIV to the New Living Translation beginning with the 2021–2022 season.

In the media 
Bible Quiz is the name of a feature documentary by filmmaker Nicole Teeny. The film is a coming-of-age story of an Assemblies of God teen Bible Quizzer on her quest to win the 2008 National Bible Quiz Championship which took place in Green Bay, Wisconsin that year. The film premiered at the 2013 Slamdance Film Festival where it won the Grand Jury Award for Best Documentary and was picked up for distribution.

Bible Bowl was a Christian game show in the United States. Hosted by "Coach" Jack Gray and a robot, the program featured competition between two teams (the Bible Boys and the Gospel Girls). Taped at KJRH in Tulsa, Oklahoma, the show occasionally appeared on various religious cable television channels in the 1970s & 1980s.

See also 
 The American Bible Challenge
 International Bible Contest

References

External links 
 United Pentecostal Church Bible Quizzing Website
 Official Website of Bible Quiz Fellowship
 Website for Assemblies of God National JBQ
 Official website for Assemblies of God Teen Bible Quiz
 The Bible Quizzing Source
 Biblequiz.com
 Nazarene Bible Quizzing Website
 Free Methodist Bible Quizzing
 QuizCoach.com - Free quizzing resources
 BibleQuizPodcast - A podcast about Bible Quiz
 Website for the Great Lakes Bible Bowl in Michigan
 World Bible Quiz Association
 Pathfinder Bible Achievement
 Bible Quizzing
 Rules Comparison on BQExperience.net
 Official ACC Bible Quizzing website

Student quiz competitions
Bible in popular culture